Aldehyde dehydrogenase, mitochondrial is an enzyme that in humans is encoded by the ALDH2  gene located on chromosome 12. This protein belongs to the aldehyde dehydrogenase family of enzymes. Aldehyde dehydrogenase is the second enzyme of the major oxidative pathway of alcohol metabolism. Two major liver isoforms of aldehyde dehydrogenase, cytosolic and mitochondrial, can be distinguished by their electrophoretic mobilities, kinetic properties, and subcellular localizations.

Most Caucasians have two major isozymes, while approximately 50% of East Asians have the cytosolic isozyme but not the mitochondrial isozyme. A remarkably higher frequency of acute alcohol intoxication among East Asians than among Caucasians could be related to the absence of a catalytically active form of the mitochondrial isozyme. The increased exposure to acetaldehyde in individuals with the catalytically inactive form may also confer greater susceptibility to many types of cancer.

Gene 
The ALDH2 gene is about 44 kbp in length and contains at least 13 exons which encode 517 amino acid residues. Except for the signal NH2-terminal peptide, which is absent in the mature enzyme, the amino acid sequence deduced from the exons coincided with the reported primary structure of human liver ALDH2. Several introns contain Alu repetitive sequences. A TATA-like sequence (TTATAAAA) and a CAAT-like sequence (GTCATCAT) are located 473 and 515 bp, respectively, upstream from the translation initiation codon. In mice the official full name of the gene is aldehyde dehydrogenase 2, mitochondrial, and it is positioned on chromosome 5. It has 12 exons and the coding sequence is 1,560 base pairs.

Enzyme structure 
The enzyme encoded by the human ALDH2 gene is a tetrameric enzyme that contains three domains; two dinucleotide-binding domains and a three-stranded beta-sheet domain. The active site of ALDH2 is divided into two halves by the nicotinamide ring of NAD+. Adjacent to the A-side (Pro-R) of the nicotinamide ring is a cluster of three cysteines (Cys301, Cys302 and Cys303) and adjacent to the B-side (Pro-S) are Thr244, Glu268, Glu476 and an ordered water molecule bound to Thr244 and Glu476. Although there is a recognizable Rossmann fold, the coenzyme-binding region of ALDH2 binds NAD+ in a manner not seen in other NAD+-binding enzymes. The positions of the residues near the nicotinamide ring of NAD+ suggest a chemical mechanism whereby Glu268 functions as a general base through a bound water molecule. The sidechain amide nitrogen of Asn169 and the peptide nitrogen of Cys302 are in position to stabilize the oxyanion present in the tetrahedral transition state prior to hydride transfer. The functional importance of residue Glu487 now appears to be due to indirect interactions of this residue with the substrate-binding site via Arg264 and Arg475.

Isoforms 
Two major liver isoforms of this enzyme, cytosolic and mitochondrial, can be distinguished by their electrophoretic mobilities, kinetic properties, and subcellular localizations. The ALDH2 gene encodes a mitochondrial isoform, which has a low Km for acetaldehydes, and is localized in mitochondrial matrix; in contrast the ALDH1 gene codes for the cytosolic isoform.

Function 
Mitochondrial aldehyde dehydrogenase belongs to the aldehyde dehydrogenase family of enzymes that catalyze the chemical transformation from acetaldehyde to acetic acid. Aldehyde dehydrogenase is the second enzyme of the major oxidative pathway of alcohol metabolism. Additionally, ALDH2 functions as a protector against oxidative stress.

Clinical significance 

Most Caucasians have two major isozymes, while approximately 50% of  East Asians have one normal copy of the ALDH2 gene and one variant copy (ALDH2*2, rs671) that encodes an inactive mitochondrial isoenzyme. In native Japanese, this variant ALDH2 allele encodes lysine instead of glutamic acid at amino acid 487 and therefore encodes a product protein that is completely inactive in metabolizing acetaldehyde to acetic acid. In the overall Japanese population, about 57% of individuals are homozygous for the normal allele, 40% are heterozygous for the variant allele, and 3% are homozygous for the variant allele.  Since ALDH2 assembles and functions as a tetramer and requires all four of its components to be active in order to metabolize acetaldehyde, heterozygotes have very little ALDH2 activity.  Accordingly, individuals heterozygous or homozygous for the abnormal allele metabolize ethanol to acetaldehyde normally but metabolize acetaldehyde poorly and are thereby susceptible to certain adverse effects of alcoholic (i.e., ethanol-containing) beverages; these effects include the transient accumulation of acetaldehyde in blood and tissues; facial flushing (i.e. the "Asian flushing syndrome"), urticaria, systemic dermatitis, and alcohol-induced respiratory reactions such as rhinitis and the exacerbation of asthma bronchoconstriction.  The cited allergic reaction-like symptoms: a) do not appear due to classical IgE or T cell-related allergen-induced reactions but rather the actions of acetaldehyde in stimulating the release of histamine, a probable mediating cause of these symptoms; b) typically occur within 30–60 minutes of ingesting alcoholic beverages; and c) occur in other Asian as well as non-Asian individuals that are either seriously defective in metabolizing ingested ethanol past acetaldehyde to acetic acid or, alternatively, that metabolize ethanol too rapidly for ALDH2 processing.

A remarkably higher frequency of acute alcohol intoxication among East Asians than among Caucasians has been repeatedly shown to be related to the greatly reduced activity of the variant ALDH2*2 isoenzyme. This variant has a significantly distorted coenzyme binding site. During the 80's there has been a steady increase in the number of Japanese alcoholics who manage to overcome their genetically determined aversion to alcoholism from the dominant effects of an ALDH2*2 mutation. This trend demonstrates that, even among those least likely to succumb to alcoholism, there are social pressures to drink.

An activator of ALDH2 enzymatic activity, Alda-1 (N-(1,3-benzodioxol-5-ylmethyl)-2,6-dichlorobenzamide), has been shown to reduce ischemia-induced cardiac damage caused by myocardial infarction.

Interactions 
ALDH2 has been shown to interact with GroEL.

See also 
 Acetaldehyde dehydrogenase
 Alcohol dehydrogenase
 Alcohol flush reaction
 Alcohol-induced respiratory reactions

References

Further reading

External links 

 
 

EC 1.2.1
Genes on human chromosome 12